Marion Ettlinger (born 1949) is a photographer specializing in author portraits. 
Ettlinger's portrait photography appears on many book jackets. During her long career she has photographed Truman Capote, Tom Wolfe, William Styron, Raymond Carver, Joyce Carol Oates, Sarah Vowell and many more. A collection of her portraits, Author Photo: Portraits, 1983-2002 was published in 2003 by Simon & Schuster.

She has been a photographer for over 35 years, although only during the last twenty years has she focused her work on authors.

Other authors she has worked with over the years include:
 Cormac McCarthy
 Stewart O'Nan
 Elizabeth Wurtzel
 George Plimpton
 Jeffrey Eugenides
 Francine Prose 
 Alice Munro
 Elissa Schappell

References

External links
 mediabistro.com interview
 Photographer's Website

American photographers
Living people
1949 births
American women photographers
21st-century American women